Aarschot is a city and municipality in the province of Flemish Brabant, in Flanders, Belgium. The municipality comprises the city of Aarschot proper and the towns of Gelrode, Langdorp and Rillaar. On January 1, 2019, Aarschot had a total population of 30,106.

It is located in the part of Flemish Brabant called Hageland, located to the east of Leuven. Aarschot is a very typical town with a long history, dating back to the era of the Roman emperors, according to myths.  The church, which dominates the look of the city, is built with the typical brown stone quarried from the hills in the surrounding areas.  These same hills were in the Middle Ages home to some of the most well-regarded vineyards of Europe. Today the chain hills, which originate in Bolderberg, Heusden-Zolder, and continue as far as Calais in France, are mainly covered with woods and fruit yards.

While the Church of Our Lady (Onze-Lieve-Vrouwekerk) definitely leaves its mark on the appearance of the city, nothing defines Aarschot better than the river that passes through it: the Demer. Aarschot is situated in the valley of this brown-colored river.

Aarschot was hit very hard in World War I. When German troops occupied the city on 19 August 1914, Colonel Stenger, commander of the 8th German Infantry Brigade, was shot dead on the balcony of the town hall. The German reprisal was extremely harsh.
Many houses were set alight and 156 people were executed, including Mayor Tielemans and his 15-year-old son. The next day, the entire population was ordered to evacuate the city.

Famous inhabitants
 Front 242, electronic music group
 Scala & Kolacny Brothers, choir
 Dany Verlinden, soccer player

References

External links

Official website  - Only available in Dutch
Aarschot, martyr city

Municipalities of Flemish Brabant